A bivalve shell is part of the body, the exoskeleton or shell, of a bivalve mollusk. In life, the shell of this class of mollusks is composed of two hinged parts or valves. Bivalves are very common in essentially all aquatic locales, including saltwater, brackish water, and freshwater. The shells of bivalves commonly wash up on beaches (often as separate valves) and along the edges of lakes, rivers, and streams. 
Bivalves by definition possess two shells or valves, a "right valve" and a "left valve", that are joined by a ligament. The two valves usually articulate with one another using structures known as "teeth" which are situated along the hinge line. In many  bivalve shells, the two valves are symmetrical along the hinge line—when truly symmetrical, such an animal is said to be equivalved; if the valves vary from each other in size or shape, inequivalved.  If symmetrical front-to-back, the valves are said to be equilateral, and are otherwise considered inequilateral.

This exoskeleton serves not only for muscle attachment, but also for protection from predators and from mechanical damage.  The shell has several layers, and is typically made of calcium carbonate precipitated out into an organic matrix. It is secreted by a part of the molluscan body known as the mantle. The shells of bivalves are equal sides connected by a hinge.

Bivalve shells are collected by professional and amateur conchologists and are sometimes harvested for commercial sale in the international shell trade or for use in glue, chalk, or varnish, occasionally to the detriment of the local ecology.

Shell anatomy, structure and composition

The bivalve shell is composed of two calcareous valves. The mantle, a thin membrane surrounding the body, secretes the shell valves, ligament, and hinge teeth. The mantle lobes secrete the valves, and the mantle crest creates the other parts.

The mantle itself is attached to the shell by numerous small mantle retractor muscles, which are arranged in a narrow line along the length of the interior of the shell. The position of this line is often quite clearly visible on the inside of each valve of a bivalve shell, as a shiny line, the pallial line, which runs along a small distance in from the outer edge of each valve, usually joining the anterior adductor muscle scar to the posterior adductor muscle scar. The adductor muscles are what allow the bivalve to close the shell tightly.

In some bivalves the mantle edges fuse to form siphons, which take in and expel water during suspension feeding. Species which live buried in sediment usually have long siphons, and when the bivalve needs to close its shell, these siphons retract into a pocket-like space in the mantle. This feature of the internal anatomy of a bivalve is clearly indicated on the interior of the shell surface as a pallial sinus, an indentation in the pallial line. In addition, the water flows through incurrent siphon ventrally and exit out of the body through excurrent dorsally to the body.

The valves of the shell are made of either calcite (as with, e.g. oysters) or both calcite and aragonite, usually with the aragonite forming an inner layer, as is the case with the Pteriida which have this layer in the form of nacre or mother of pearl. The outermost layer of the shell is known as the periostracum and is composed of a horny organic substance. This sometimes forms a yellowish or brownish "skin" on the outside of the shell. The periostracum may start to peel off of a shell when the shell is allowed to dry out for long periods.

The shell is added to, and increases in size, in two ways—by increments added to the open edge of the shell, and by a gradual thickening throughout the animal's life.

The two shell valves are held together at the animal's dorsum by the ligament, which is composed of the tensilium and resilium. In life the ligament opens the shell (like a bent eraser in a door hinge), and the adductor muscle or muscles close the shell (like a person pulling the door closed by the handle).  When a bivalve dies, its adductor muscle(s) relax and the resilium pushes the valves open.

Cementation
A few groups of bivalves are active swimmers like the scallops; many bivalves live buried in soft sediments (are infaunal) and can actively move around using their muscular foot; some bivalves such as blue mussels attach themselves to hard substrates using a byssus; other groups of bivalves (such as oysters, thorny oysters, jewel boxes, kitten's paws, jingle shells, etc.) cement their lower valve to a hard substrate (using shell material as cement) and this fixes them permanently in place. In many species of cemented bivalves (for example the jewel boxes), the lower valve is more deeply cupped than the upper valve, which tends to be rather flat. In some groups of cemented bivalves the lower or cemented valve is the left valve, in others it is the right valve.

Orientation

The oldest point of a bivalve shell is called the beak, and the raised area around it is known as the umbo (plural umbones). The hinge area is the dorsum or back of the shell. The lower, curved margin is the ventral side.

The anterior or front of the shell is where the byssus and foot are located (if the animal has these structures) and the posterior or back of the shell is where the siphon is located (again, if present— the scallops, for example, do not have siphons). Without being able to view these organs, however, determining anterior and posterior can be rather more difficult.  In those animals with a siphon, the pallial sinus of the siphon, which will be present on both the left and right valves, will point towards the animal's posterior— such valves are called sinopalliate.

Shells without a pallial sinus are termed integripalliate— such animals (as mentioned, the scallops as well as some other groups) often have a byssal notch present on the anterior end of the right valve (only), and the anterior auricles or "wings" of both valves will be either larger than, or equal to, the posterior ones.  Such valves may also have a distinctive "comb" or ctinoleum within the byssal notch on the right valve.  If a valve has neither notch nor comb nor sinus, and the auricles are of the same size, it is likely to be a left valve.

In those animals whose valves have an umbo that seems to "point", that point is most often towards the anterior part of the valve (though there are some exceptions to this rule).  Also, in those bivalves with two adductor muscle scars of different sizes, the posterior scar will be the larger of the two and will be visible on both valves— this condition is referred to as being anisomyarian; if the scars are of equal size, this is termed isomyarian; if the valve has only one muscle scar, this is termed monomyarian.  Furthermore, in those animals with a distinct external ligament, the ligament is usually to the posterior side of the umbo of both valves.  Using one or more of these guidelines should strongly suggest the anterior/ posterior orientation of any given bivalve shell, and therefore whether any particular shell belongs to the right side or the left.

Age estimation

The age of bivalve molluscs can be estimated in several ways.  The Noah's Ark clam Arca noae has been used to compare these methods: the annual growth rings on the exterior of the valves can be counted at one per year and give a satisfactory result, but sometimes spurts of growth occur which may create an extra ring and cause confusion. Early rings may get worn away near the umbones and the narrow rings near the margin may be difficult to interpret in fully grown individuals. Similar annual pallial line scars on the interior of the valves are more easily seen in dark colored shells, but these may be overgrown and obscured by further deposition of hard material. Another method is the examination of the growth lines and bands seen in acetate peel replicas taken in the region of the umbones. The most accurate but most time-consuming method is the microscopic examination of sections through the outer prismatic layer of the shell. Using more than one of these methods should increase the accuracy of the result.

Hinge teeth
The hinge teeth (dentition) or lack of them is an important feature of bivalve shells. They are generally conservative within major groups, and have historically provided a convenient means upon which to base classification schemes and the phylogenetic order.  Some of the various hinge tooth  arrangements are as follows:

 Taxodont; rows of similar interlocking teeth on either side of the umbones, as in the arc clams.
 Dysodont; weak teeth near the umbones, as in the marine mussels.
 Isodont; lateral tubercles and sockets on either side of a thick ligament referred to as a resilifer, typical of the oysters and scallops.
 Heterodont; with several wedge-shaped cardinal teeth set within the umbones, may or may not have elongated lateral  teeth on either side.  This arrangement is characteristic of the venus clams, cockles and several other important groups.
 Asthenodont; cardinal teeth replaced by a large chondrophore or resilifer, as in the soft-shell clams
 Anodont; true teeth absent in adults as in razor clams, and some freshwater mussels such as Anodonta and Anodontites

Uses 
Bivalve shells have many uses, leading international trade in bivalves and their shells. These uses include:
 Aesthetic
 Jewellery, in particular nacre (mother of pearl)
 High-quality Go stones
 Conchology (in the sense of collection rather than research)
 Raw material
 Chalk
 Glue
 Varnish
 Food
 (Greenshell mussel) As a supplement for use against inflammation-associated arthritis in humans and animals, though a 2006 review suggested a lack of compelling evidence in human cases.
 Other
 Shell money, a medium of exchange

See also 
 Aspein
 Molluscs in culture

References

External links 

A glossary of terms used to describe bivalves: 

Bivalve anatomy
Mollusc shells